The 2006 CCHA Men's Ice Hockey Tournament was the 35th CCHA Men's Ice Hockey Tournament. It was played between March 3 and March 18, 2006. Opening round and quarterfinal games were played at campus sites, while the semifinals, third place, and championship games were played at Joe Louis Arena in Detroit, Michigan. By winning the tournament, Michigan State won the Mason Cup and received the Central Collegiate Hockey Association's automatic bid to the 2006 NCAA Division I Men's Ice Hockey Tournament.

Conference standings
Note: GP = Games played; W = Wins; L = Losses; T = Ties; PTS = Points; GF = Goals For; GA = Goals Against

Bracket

Note: * denotes overtime period(s)

First round

(5) Nebraska-Omaha vs. (12) Bowling Green

(6) Lake Superior State vs. (11) Western Michigan

(7) Ferris State vs. (10) Ohio State

(8) Notre Dame vs. (9) Alaska-Fairbanks

Quarterfinals

(1) Miami vs. (11) Western Michigan

(2) Michigan State vs. (9) Alaska-Fairbanks

(3) Michigan vs. (7) Ferris State

(4) Northern Michigan vs. (5) Nebraska-Omaha

Semifinals

(1) Miami vs. (4) Northern Michigan

(2) Michigan State vs. (3) Michigan

Third place

(3) Michigan vs. (4) Northern Michigan

Championship

(1) Miami vs. (2) Michigan State

Tournament awards

All-Tournament Team
F Drew Miller (Michigan State)
F Ryan Jones (Miami)
F Tim Crowder (Michigan State)
D Matt Hunwick (Michigan)
D Andy Greene (Miami)
G Jeff Lerg* (Michigan State)
* Most Valuable Player(s)

References

External links
2006 CCHA Men's Ice Hockey Tournament

CCHA Men's Ice Hockey Tournament
Ccha tournament